NGC 477 is a spiral galaxy in the constellation Andromeda. It is located approximately 250 million light-years from Earth and was discovered on October 18, 1786 by astronomer William Herschel.

See also  
 Spiral galaxy 
 List of NGC objects (1–1000)

References

External links 
 
 
 SEDS

Spiral galaxies
Andromeda (constellation)
0477
4915
Astronomical objects discovered in 1786
Discoveries by William Herschel